São Geraldo is the Portuguese word for "Saint Gerald". It may refer to:

Places 
Brazil
 São Geraldo, Minas Gerais
 São Geraldo, Porto Alegre, Rio Grande do Sul
 São Geraldo da Piedade, Minas Gerais
 São Geraldo do Araguaia, Pará
 São Geraldo do Baixio, Minas Gerais